The 2004 Cape Verdean Football Championship season was the 25th of the competition of the first-tier football in Cape Verde. Its started on 8 May and finished on 10 July, earlier than the last season. The tournament was organized by the Cape Verdean Football Federation.

Overview 
Académico do Aeroporto was the defending team of the title. A total of 11 clubs participated in the competition, one from each island league. No club participated from the Santo Antão Island League (South) due to the regional championship was not held, again in several seasons, also the champion of a previous season competed at the nationals, Académico do Aeroporto from the island of Sal participated. As that club were also regional winners, again a runner-up of the regionals qualified and was Santa Maria from the south of the island. A total of 93 goals were scored, Ravs scored the most numbering 11 (more than 10% of the total).

There were no competition in the first week of July due to the municipal elections that were taking place.

Participating clubs 

 Académico do Aeroporto, winner of the 2003 Cape Verdean Football Championships
 SC Sal Rei, winner of the Boa Vista Island League
 Nô Pintcha, winner of the Brava Island League
 Vulcânicos FC, winner of the Fogo Island League
 Onze Unidos, winner of the Maio Island League
 SC Santa Maria, runner up of the Sal Island League
 Estrela dos Amadores, winner of the Santiago Island League (North)
 Académica da Praia, winner of the Santiago Island League (South)
 Paulense Desportivo Clube, winner of the Santo Antão Island League (North)
 FC Ultramarina, winner of the São Nicolau Island League
 Académica do Mindelo, winner of the São Vicente Island League

Information about the clubs

Overview 

The league was contested with 12 clubs, Sal-Rei FC would win the championship.

League standings 
 Group A 

 Group B

Results 
The league's highest scoring game would be Académico Aeroporto defeating Paulense 6-0.

Final Stages

Semi-finals

Finals

Statistics 
 Top scorer: Ravs: 11 goals (Sal Rei FC)
 Biggest win: Académico Aeroporto 6-0 Paulense (May 29)

Footnotes

External links 
 https://web.archive.org/web/20150924011016/http://www.fcf.cv/pt/
 

Cape Verdean Football Championship seasons
1
Cape